3′-Monoiodothyronine is a monoiodinated thyronine.

References

Iodinated tyrosine derivatives
Human hormones
Hormones of the thyroid gland
Hormones of the hypothalamus-pituitary-thyroid axis